The Brookshire Grocery Arena (formerly CenturyLink Center, CenturyTel Center, and Bossier City Arena) is a 14,000-seat multi-purpose arena, in Bossier City, Louisiana. The naming rights were purchased by the company Brookshire Grocery Group of Tyler, Texas in 2021.

History
Opened in 2000 during the administration of then Bossier City Mayor George Dement, the center is among several projects financed in part from revenues derived from three casinos in the city.

The center was home to the Bossier–Shreveport Battle Wings AFL team and the Bossier-Shreveport Mudbugs CHL team.

It hosted the Southland Conference men's basketball tournament in 2001. In 2011, the CenturyLink Center with the Louisiana Tech Lady Techsters hosted 1st and 2nd-round games for the NCAA women's basketball tournament including the first two games of eventual champion Texas A&M.

UFC 37: High Impact was a mixed martial arts event held by the Ultimate Fighting Championship at the CenturyTel Center in Bossier City, Louisiana on May 10, 2002.

On September 28, 2002, the NHL came to the arena, for a pre-season game, between the Nashville Predators and Atlanta Thrashers.

On January 14, 2007, the CHL All-Star game was played at the arena, for the first time ever, hosted by the Mudbugs.

On October 24, 2014, CLC held an NBA preseason game between the New Orleans Pelicans and Dallas Mavericks.

On October 1, 2016, CLC held another NBA preseason game between the New Orleans Pelicans and Dallas Mavericks.

Concert history

See also
List of music venues

References

External links

Bossier–Shreveport Battle Wings
Indoor arenas in Louisiana
Indoor ice hockey venues in Louisiana
College basketball venues in the United States
Basketball venues in Louisiana
Mixed martial arts venues in Louisiana
Volleyball venues in Louisiana
Wrestling venues in Louisiana
Sports venues in Shreveport, Louisiana
Music venues in Louisiana
Buildings and structures in Bossier City, Louisiana
Bossier-Shreveport Mudbugs